Caroline Lee-Johnson is a British actress. She is best known for her starring roles in Chef! as Janice Blackstock and The Knock as Diane Ralston. Her work has been primarily in television, but she has also had roles in films, including The Defender. Lee-Johnson trained at the Guildhall School of Music and Drama, London.

Career performances

TV programmes
The following are selected television programmes with performances by Caroline Lee-Johnson.

Films
The following are selected films with performances by Caroline Lee-Johnson.

Theatre
Below are selected live performances by Caroline Lee-Johnson.

References

External links

TV.com profile archive

Black British actresses
Year of birth missing (living people)
Living people
English television actresses
20th-century British actresses
English people of Malawian descent
21st-century British actresses
English film actresses
20th-century English women
20th-century English people
21st-century English women
21st-century English people
Alumni of the Guildhall School of Music and Drama